Shania Hayles (born 22 December 1999) is a professional footballer who plays as a forward for Bristol City playing in England's FA Women's Championship and for the Jamaica women's national team.

Club career

Aston Villa 
Hayles returned to Aston Villa in July 2019 from Birmingham City having started her youth career at the club.

Hayles scored two goals against Bristol City on 9 December 2020, her first goals in the top flight of English football.

She announced her departure from the club on Twitter on 19 May 2022.

International career

Having represented England at under-19 level, Hayles also qualifies for Jamaica through her heritage and gets her first call-up to Reggae Girlz for June international break camp.

Before debuting for Jamaica internationally in 2021 she had previously played for England Under-19s in 2018.

Career statistics

Club

Notes

References

1999 births
Living people
Citizens of Jamaica through descent
Jamaican women's footballers
Women's association football forwards
Jamaica women's international footballers
Sportspeople from Burton upon Trent
Footballers from Staffordshire
English women's footballers
Aston Villa W.F.C. players
Birmingham City W.F.C. players
Women's Championship (England) players
Women's Super League players
England women's youth international footballers
English sportspeople of Jamaican descent
Black British sportswomen